Phillip Broughton is a British former semi-professional wrestler and politician. Broughton previously ran his own wrestling promotion GBW and is a 3-time GBW Hardcore Champion. Broughton stood for the UK Independence Party in Hartlepool at the 2015 and 2017 general elections. In July 2016, he announced that he was running to be leader of UKIP in the UK Independence Party leadership election, 2016 following the resignation of Nigel Farage. Broughton said the party needed to change its "tone". He achieved 8.4% of the vote.

Elections contested
Broughton has contested two elections under the UKIP banner:

UK Parliament & EU elections

At the 2015 general election, Broughton was selected to fight the seat of Hartlepool where he fought a campaign alongside the Conservative Party candidate Richard Royal, where they both attempted  to present themselves as the only viable alternatives to Labour party candidate Iain Wright.

As a result, much of the anti-Labour vote was split, with UKIP and the Conservatives gaining a combined 48.9% compared to Iain Wright’s 35.6%. Broughton achieved a 21% swing in the UKIP vote, but neither of the candidates were able to take enough votes individually to defeat Labour. Broughton finished in second place, beating the Conservatives and coming within just over 3,000 votes of Labour.

At the 2017 general election, Broughton finished in third place where the UKIP vote share decreased significantly, similar to what was seen nationality. This time, Broughton finished in third place with 4,801 votes with just 11.5% of the overall vote. Broughton also achieved the second best UKIP result in the country.

UKIP leadership bid
On 1 August 2016 Broughton stood to be the leader of UKIP after Nigel Farage stepped down. Where he campaigned and took part in leadership hustings.

Broughton finished fourth out of five, receiving 8.6% of the overall vote, retaining his deposit and finishing ahead of Elizabeth Jones.

In the leadership election that occurred after Diane James stood down as leader after 18 days, citing personal issues, Broughton endorsed Paul Nuttall to become the next leader of UKIP.

Personal life
Broughton is a former semi-professional wrestler who wrestled and co-ran his own promotion GBW from 2012 to 2014. His ring name was The One and Only Phillip Alexander. Phillip Alexander in GBW's one-off last show in October 2018 won the GBW Hardcore title in a 4 man mini-tournament. Phillip Alexander defeated Mr. America in the Semi-Finals and Ryan Lord in the tournament final to win the GBW Hardcore title. Phillip is a 3-time GBW Hardcore Champion having also won and lost the GBW Hardcore title several times in GBW's last one-off shows and matches between October 2018 and October 2019. Link below;

Broughton now works as a supervisor for Tesco.

In February 2018, Broughton confirmed he had resigned from UKIP and British politics.

References

Date of birth missing (living people)
Living people
21st-century British politicians
UK Independence Party politicians
UK Independence Party parliamentary candidates
Year of birth missing (living people)
Sportspeople from Hartlepool
British Eurosceptics